Dame Calliopa Pearlette Louisy   (born 8 June 1946) is a Saint Lucian academic, who served as governor-general of Saint Lucia from 19 September 1997, until her resignation on 31 December 2017. She is the first woman to hold the vice-regal office.

Biography
Born in the village of Laborie, Saint Lucia, Louisy attended the Laborie Infant School and Primary Schools.  In 1960 she proceeded to the Saint Joseph's Convent on the Javouhey Scholarship. In 1966, a year after the completion of her secondary education she was awarded the Canadian International Development Agency (CIDA) scholarship to pursue a Bachelor's Degree in English and French at the University of the West Indies at Cave Hill, Barbados.

In 1972, she was awarded the Canadian Commonwealth Scholarship and Fellowship Plan to pursue a M.A. degree in Linguistics, in the field of Didactics at Université Laval in Quebec City, Canada. In 1991, she proceeded to the University of Bristol in the United Kingdom, where she read for a Ph.D. degree in Education. 

Louisy has contributed significantly to the development of Education in Saint Lucia, having spent most of her professional life in the teaching profession. During the periods 1969–72 and 1975–76, she taught at the St Joseph's Convent. From 1976 to 1986, she served as a tutor of French, and was subsequently appointed as Principal of the St. Lucia A Level College. When the A Level College and Morne Technical School merged into the Sir Arthur Lewis Community College, she first served as Dean, and was subsequently appointed as the Vice Principal and Principal of the College. 

In 1999, Louisy was awarded the Honorary degree of Doctor of Laws (LL.D.) by the University of Bristol. On 16 July 1999, she was appointed Dame Grand Cross of the Order of St. Michael and St. George. In 2011, she received an Honorary Doctor of Laws (LLB) from the University of West Indies.

Honours

National honours
  –  : Grand Cross of the Order of Saint Lucia (GCSL)

Commonwealth Honours
  –  : Dame Grand Cross of the Order of St. Michael and St. George (GCMG)
  –  : Dame of Grace of the Most Venerable Order of St. John (DStJ)

Papal honours
  –  : Dame of the Equestrian Order of St. Gregory the Great (DSG)

See also
List of Governors-General of Saint Lucia
Politics of Saint Lucia
List of national leaders

References

External links
Office of the Governor General

1946 births
Alumni of the University of Bristol
Dames Grand Cross of the Order of St Michael and St George
Governors-General of Saint Lucia
Grand Cross of the Order of Saint Lucia
Dames of St. Gregory the Great
Living people
People from Laborie Quarter
Saint Lucian educators
20th-century Saint Lucian women politicians
Université Laval alumni
University of the West Indies alumni
21st-century Saint Lucian women politicians
21st-century Saint Lucian politicians
Saint Lucian dames